The Caretaker's Cabin is a historic log cabin in the Cedar Breaks National Monument in southeastern Iron County, Utah, United States, that is listed on the National Register of Historic Places (NRHP).

Description
The cabin was built in 1937 by the Civilian Conservation Corps (CCC) in the National Park Service rustic style. The cabin was constructed of peeled logs with dramatically extended ends, cut to a tapered buttress shape. A large, battered stone chimney at one end echoes the log detailing. The roof is covered by cedar shakes.

A second chimney, plainer with straight sides, is located at the rear. The porch is inset into the front facade, covered by the main roof.

The Cedar Breaks Caretaker's Cabin was listed on the NRHP on August 4, 1983. The nearby Cedar Breaks National Monument Visitor Center was built to a similar design by the same CCC crew from the Zion CCC camp

See also

 National Register of Historic Places listings in Iron County, Utah

References

External links

Cedar Breaks National Monument
National Park Service buildings and structures
Buildings and structures in Iron County, Utah
Residential buildings completed in 1937
Residential buildings on the National Register of Historic Places in Utah
Park buildings and structures on the National Register of Historic Places in Utah
Civilian Conservation Corps in Utah
National Park Service rustic in Utah
National Register of Historic Places in Iron County, Utah
1937 establishments in Utah